The Timok Rebellion was a popular uprising that began in eastern Serbia (now the region of the Timok Valley) on 28 September 1883, led by the People's Radical Party. It has been called the most important event in Serbia between independence (1878) and the First Balkan War (1912). The first battle occurred at Lukovo on 21 October, when the rebels defeated Royal Serbian Army forces sent to suppress them.

According to the Radical politician Pera Todorović, at a planning meeting of the Radicals' Executive Committee before the rising, one member suggested killing all bureaucrats. In the words of the Great Soviet Encyclopedia, the rebels were motivated by "such vestiges of feudalism as payment in labor and bondage imposed for the nonpayment of debts, as well as an unbearable tax burden, bureaucratic tyranny, and the growing power of commercial and usurious capital." Among their demands were a reduction in taxes, greater local self-government and the maintenance of the militia. On 2 November, peasants across the region refused to hand over their weapons to military units unless they were given modern replacements. It took the reformed Royal Army only a couple of weeks to crush the poorly organised rebellion, which at its height had controlled almost half the country and had threatened the line between Belgrade and Niš. At the start of the rebellion, King Milan I was afraid that the soldiers would not "be willing to fire into the flesh of their own people", but his decision to pay officers double what top bureaucrats earned and to give bonus pay to soldiers who fought the rebels proved his fears ungrounded. The consul of Austria-Hungary in Belgrade noted that "a new page was written in the history of the Serbian people when the army launched its first shell at the rebels."

After the rebellion, many Radical leaders, including Nikola Pašić, fled abroad. Of the participants who remained, 809 were put on trial. Of these, 567 were sentenced to forced labour, 68 to prison, 5 to detention and 75 were released. The remaining 94 were sentenced to death: twenty were executed right away, one committed suicide, ten escaped and fled abroad and 63 were eventually pardoned.

The Timok Valley was and still is populated by a Romanian community which participated in the rebellion. In recent times, this has been commemorated by ethnic Romanian organizations in Serbia and Bulgaria.

Notes

Further reading
Scott W. Lackey. "A Secret Austro-Hungarian Plan to Intervene in the 1884 Timok Uprising in Serbia: Unpublished Documents". Austrian History Yearbook 23 (1992): 149–59.
1880s in Serbia
Rebellions in Serbia
Kingdom of Serbia
Timok Valley
Romanians in Serbia
Conflicts in 1883